Zbiczno  is a village in Brodnica County, Kuyavian-Pomeranian Voivodeship, in north-central Poland. It is the seat of the gmina (administrative district) called Gmina Zbiczno.

The village has a population of 850.

History
During the German occupation of Poland (World War II), the occupiers forced local Poles to sign the Deutsche Volksliste. Those who refused were beaten to death by the Germans, and their bodies were laid in front of the German police station for several days to terrorize the population. Several local Poles, including school teachers, were among the victims of the massacre of Poles from the county committed by the occupiers in 1939 in nearby Brzezinki.

References

Villages in Brodnica County